The AWA Tower is a heritage-listed office and communications complex in Sydney, in the state of New South Wales, Australia built for Amalgamated Wireless Australasia Limited. The AWA Tower consists of a radio transmission tower atop a 15-storey building. It is located in the Sydney central business district at 45-47 York Street, close to Wynyard Park and Wynyard railway station. It was designed by Robertson, Marks and McCredie in association with DT Morrow and Gordon and built from 1937 to 1939 by William Hughes and Co. Pty Ltd. It was added to the New South Wales State Heritage Register on 2 April 1999.

History

The AWA Tower was designed by architects Morrow and Gordon from 1937–1939 and became one of the most notable commercial buildings of Sydney. It brought geometric Art Deco design and modernism to the city skyline with polished trachyte facing at ground level intending to signal a progressive and go-ahead firm. The 1939 steel-framed brick building was designed by Robertson, Marks and McCredie. The tower was modelled on Berlin's Funkturm Tower, built a few years earlier, and both took inspiration from the Eiffel Tower in Paris. The communications tower was an integral part of the structure and remained the tallest structure in Sydney (other than the Sydney Harbour Bridge) until the 1960s.

The building is decorated with appropriate symbols of communication, including a winged Pegasus, said to be chosen by Sir Ernest Fisk, the pioneer of wireless technology and a founding director of AWA. For many years, the tower wore the sign "Beam Wireless", a service providing radio contact to commercial shipping on the England–Australia route introduced in 1927.

Amalgamated Wireless Australasia Limited was the first to manufacture televisions in Australia, and in the 1960s large AWA neon logos were attached to the building to symbolise this fact. In later years, the company expanded into a wide range of electronic products, including gaming systems. In 2000, when the company folded, the building was sold to Jupiter's Casino Group. It is covered by a conservation order, and remains known as the AWA building, although the big red AWA signs have been removed. The tower, which was demolished and rebuilt in 1994, remains illuminated at night, but the viewing platform has long been gone.

The tower (featuring the AWA logo) features in the science fiction film The Matrix; when Neo and Trinity rescue Morpheus from the agents, the AWA Tower can be seen below as they make their escape by helicopter.

Description 
The building comprises 12 office floors, a ground floor and basement. The building is steel framed and faced in brick with polished trachyte facing at the ground floor.

The building is vertically modelled to give a skyscraper appearance. A Pegasus is depicted in relief sculpture on a plain brick parapet at the top of the building. Pegasus, a winged horse, was chosen by Sir Ernest Fisk as a suitable association with the work of Australia's great wireless undertaking. The building retains the original Fisk system of double glazed windows. The communications tower was designed as an integral part of the building and its supports are part of the structure of the building.

The York Street Entry Foyer and Lift Lobby is faced with Wombeyan Russet marble with simple Art Deco streamlined detail and the letter AWA over the entrance. The former Vestibule (main ground floor) interior retains its silver ash timber panelling. Above the panelling there is a series of symbolic plaster reliefs executed by Otto Steen. Three reliefs constitute three "themes". In each corner are figures representing the four ancient elements - earth, water, fire and air. Over the entrance surrounding an AWA symbol are the signs of the zodiac. A series of small reliefs along the north and south walls represent various nations, symbolising the unification of the world throughout radio. The former Entrance Lobby interior retains a map of the world incised into the polished trachyte wall above the auditorium doors.

Other significant interiors include the fifth floor Boardroom, ancillary offices and executive bathroom.
White Elevators Pty Ltd, located in Alexandria, fabricated, installed and maintained the lifts.

Construction of AWA Tower Building 1938-1939

Condition 

As at 21 November 2002, physical condition is excellent. Archaeological potential is low.

Modifications and dates 
1937 - construction began
1939 - construction completed

Heritage listing 
As at 28 August 2017, AWA Building and Tower is of significance for its important associations with radio and communication technology. It is a simple vertically emphasised skyscraper which represents the epitome of the 1930s desire to integrate architecture with technology. The tower, for a time was the tallest structure in Sydney, and is an integral part of the building and still has a landmark quality.

AWA Tower was listed on the New South Wales State Heritage Register on 2 April 1999 having satisfied the following criteria.

The place is important in demonstrating the course, or pattern, of cultural or natural history in New South Wales.

AWA Building and Tower is of historical significance because for over twenty years it was the tallest structure in Sydney and the building and tower still are an important landmark today.

The place is important in demonstrating aesthetic characteristics and/or a high degree of creative or technical achievement in New South Wales.

AWA Building and Tower is aesthetically significant because it is a simple vertical "emphasised" skyscraper which represents the epitome of the 1930s desire to integrate architecture with technology. It is part of a significant group of Art Deco office buildings located along York Street between Margaret and King Street.

The place has a strong or special association with a particular community or cultural group in New South Wales for social, cultural or spiritual reasons.

AWA Building and Tower is socially significant because of its association with the development of the radios and communications technology and industry.

See also

 Architecture of Sydney
 Tokyo Tower

References

Bibliography

Attribution 

This Wikipedia article includes content copied from the essay "AWA Tower" in the Dictionary of Sydney, 2008 and licensed under CC by-sa. Imported on 29 November 2011.

External links

"AWA Tower" database record and article (CC-By-SA) at the Dictionary of Sydney, viewed 7 September 2010.
  State Library of New South Wales - AWA Tower
 AWA Limited
 Linking a Nation: Australia's Transport and Communications 1788 - 1970
 Sydney's 'Toaster' Building - An Intruder in Distinguished Company
 Entry on Skyscraperpage.com
 Entry on Structurae

Skyscrapers in Sydney
Art Deco architecture in Sydney
Office buildings completed in 1930
Towers completed in 1930
Office buildings in Sydney
Skyscraper office buildings in Australia
New South Wales State Heritage Register sites located in the Sydney central business district
Government buildings in New South Wales
Telecommunications in Australia
Recording studios in Australia
Schools in New South Wales
Radio masts and towers in Australia
Restaurants in Sydney
Articles incorporating text from the New South Wales State Heritage Register
York Street, Sydney
1930 establishments in Australia